Jinyoung may refer to:

 Jin-young, a Korean given name (also spelled Jin-yeong or Jean-young)
 Jung Jin-young (singer), a South Korean singer, songwriter and actor and a member of boy band B1A4
 Jinyoung (entertainer, born 1994), a South Korean singer and actor and a member of the boy band Got7 and duo JJ Project

See also 

 Jinyong (disambiguation)